Siamun (“Son of Amun”) was a prince of the Eighteenth Dynasty of Egypt, a son of Pharaoh Thutmose III.

He is named on a statue of Chancellor Sennefer (now in the Egyptian Museum in Cairo), which can be dated to the reign of Thutmose III.

References

Princes of the Eighteenth Dynasty of Egypt
Children of Thutmose III